Darkest White is the seventh and final full-length album by the Norwegian gothic metal band Tristania. It is the second Tristania album to feature Mariangela Demurtas and Kjetil Nordhus on vocals.

Overview
The demo that gave birth to the final version of the songs in Darkest White were produced between June and September 2012. Soon after, the band readjusted the songs by themselves, in an improvised studio at Ole Vistnes' apartment, between September and December 2012. In January 2013, the band entered the studio to make the definitive recordings of the album, finishing in less than a month, the band's shortest recording period so far.

Early April, the band announced Darkest White official track list.

Critical reception 
The album was critically well received, and often considered the "real come back" for the band after former vocalist Vibeke Stene departure, in 2007. The album was praised for its "exploration of dark, desolate beauty" mood while called an "emotional thread". Another aspect that was well received was the "flawlessly accomplished" three-vocalist style driven throughout the album with the harsh vocals from Anders H. Hidle, the clean vocals from the returning Kjetil Nordhus and Mariangela Demurtas' female vocals. The combination of this three vocalists was considered "intelligent" and "diligent".

Track listing

Charts

Personnel

Tristania
Mariangela Demurtas – vocals
Kjetil Nordhus – vocals
Anders Høyvik Hidle – guitars & harsh vocals
Ole Vistnes – bass & vocals
Gyri Smørdal Losnegaard – guitars
Einar Moen – synths & programming*
Tarald Lie Jr. – drums
Additional personnel
Einar Moen is listed as the band's synth player in the booklet, however Bernt Moen is credited with having performed the synth on this album.

References

2013 albums
Tristania (band) albums
Napalm Records albums
Albums with cover art by Eliran Kantor